Alvdal is a municipality in Innlandet county, Norway.

Alvdal may also refer to:

Places
Alvdal (village), a village in Alvdal municipality, Innlandet county, Norway
Alvdal Church, a church in Alvdal municipality, Innlandet county, Norway
Alvdal Station, a railway station in the village of Alvdal, Innlandet county, Norway

Other
Alvdal IL, a sports team from Alvdal municipality, Innlandet county, Norway

See also
Älvdalen Municipality, a similarly spelled location in Sweden